Sanctus Diavolos is the eighth full-length album by Greek extreme metal band Rotting Christ.

It is also the first release after the departure of long-time guitarist Kostas and keyboardist George. The album features a guest appearance by Gus G. (Dream Evil, Firewind) on guitar, a live choir, and mainman Sakis Tolis handling synthesizers.

It was recorded at SCA studios in Greece and mixed by Fredrik Nordström (Studio Fredman) in Sweden.

Track listing
All songs written by Sakis Tolis. 
"Visions of a Blind Order" – 3:46
"Thy Wings Thy Horns Thy Sin" – 4:13
"Athanati Este" – 5:40
"Tyrannical" – 5:07
"You My Cross" – 4:19
"Sanctimonious" – 3:16
"Serve in Heaven" – 3:55
"Shades of Evil" – 5:14
"Doctrine" – 6:28
"Sanctus Diavolos" – 6:41

Credits
Sakis Tolis – guitars, vocals, keyboards
Andreas Lagios – bass
Themis Tolis – drums

Guests
 Gus G. – solo on track 1
 Christos Antoniou – choir arrangements

References

2004 albums
Rotting Christ albums